The 2015 Copa Panamá (officially known as Copa Cable Onda Satelital because of its sponsorship with Cable Onda) was the 1st season of the annual Panamanian knockout football cup competition. Thirty-two clubs from the first to the third tier of the Panamanian football league system participated in this year's competition which began on 5 August 2015 with the first of five rounds and ended on 9 December 2015 with the final at the Estadio Maracaná in Panama City.

San Francisco won the final against Chepo 5-4 on penalties, as the match finished 0–0 after extra time, to win their first title.

Format
The Copa Panamá is open to eligible clubs down to the third tier of the Panamanian football league system – all 10 and 14 teams from the Liga Panameña de Fútbol and Liga Nacional de Ascenso respectively participate as well as 8 of the highest ranking amateur teams in the Copa Rommel Fernández tournament based on the results and points they obtained during the FIFA calendar year prior to the start of the cup.

The competition is a 5-round knockout tournament with pairings for each round made in advance; the draw for the whole competition is made before a ball is kicked. Each tie is played as a single leg, with the exception of the two-legged quarter-finals and semi-finals. In the single leg ties clubs from lower-ranking leagues are given field preference when facing opponents from a higher-ranked league. If a match is drawn, extra time is played and in the event of a draw after 120 minutes, a penalty shoot-out is contested.

Participating teams

Results

Bracket

Round of 32

Round of 16

Quarter-finals

First leg

Second leg

Semi-finals

First leg

Second leg

Final

Top goalscorers

Notes

References

Football in Panama
2015–16 in Panamanian football
Copa Panamá